This is a list of towns, villages and populated places in Grenada. Grenada is an island nation in the south-eastern Caribbean Sea. It consists of the island of Grenada and six smaller islands at the southern end of the Grenadines island chain. There is only one city in Grenada, which is the capital, St. George's.

 Amber Belair
 Après Tout
 Bacaye
 Bacolet
 Balthazar
 Blaize
 Barique
 Bathway
 Beaton
 Beaulieu
 Becke Moui
 Bellevue
 Belmont
 Birch Grove
 Boca
 Bogles
 Bois de Gannes
 Bonaire
 Beauxchejeaux
 Calivigny
 Chantimelle
 Chutz
 Clabony
 Crochu
 Deblando
 Debra
 Diego Piece
 Dunfermline
 Elie Hall
 Fond
 Gouyave
 Grand Bras
 Granlette
 Grand Roy St.John
 Great Arm
 Great Crayfish
 Great Palmiste St.John
 Great Pond
 Grenville
 Hillsborough
 Ka-fe Beau
 L'Anse Aux Epines
 La Fortune
 La Filette
 La Mode
 L Qua Qua
 La Sagesse
 La Soubisse
 La Tante
 La Taste
 Mamma Cannes
 Maulti
 Morne Fendue
 Morne Jaloux Ridge
 Morne Longue
 Morne Ridge
 Morne Tranquille
 Mount Craven
 Mount Horne
 Mount Parnasus
 Munich
 Paraclete
 Paradise
 Petit Bacaye
 Perdmontemps
 Prospect
 Resource
 St. George's
 Sauteurs
 St. David's
 San Souci
 Telescope
 Tivoli
 Union
 Union Village
 Upper Capitol
 Upper Conference
 Upper La Tante
 Upper La Taste
 Upper Pearls
 Victoria
 Waltham
 Westerhall
 Willis

Grenada, List of cities in
 
Cities